

Births and deaths

Births
 Mike Oldfield (1953)
 Kirsty MacColl (1959–2000)
 Martin Simpson (1953)
 Clive Gregson (1955)
 Jez Lowe (1955)

Deaths
 Ralph Vaughan Williams (1872–1958)

Recordings
 1957: Sings English Folk Songs (Steve Benbow)
 1959: Sweet England (Shirley Collins)

See also
 Music of the United Kingdom (1950s)

English folk music by date
1950s in British music
1950s in England